Nóttin Langa was an album released on the 15th of November 1989 by Icelandic working class singing legend Bubbi Morthens. This pop album went to the market from Geisli.
Formed by 12 songs Nóttin Langa counted with the participation of guitarist Guðlaugur Kristinn Óttarsson.

Track listing

External links
Official site of Bubbi Morthens
Official site of Guðlaugur Kristinn Óttarsson
Page of G. K. Óttarsson at MySpace.com

1989 albums
Bubbi Morthens albums